Atco or ATCO may refer to:

Businesses
 ATCO, a Canadian diversified company involved in manufacturing, utilities, energy and technologies
 ATCO Electric, a subsidiary of the above company
 Atco (British mower company), a mower manufacturing company
 Atco Records, an American record label
 Arnold Transit Company

Places in the United States
 Atco, Georgia, an unincorporated community
 Atco, New Jersey, an unincorporated community
 Atco station, a railroad station in the above community
 Atco Lake, New Jersey

Sports facilities
 Atco Raceway, a drag strip in Atco, New Jersey
 ATCO Field, a soccer stadium in Alberta, Canada

Acronyms
Air Traffic Control Officer (ATCO)

See also
 
 
 Atco Formation, a geologic formation in Texas